Kelly Rohrbach (born January 21, 1990) is an American actress and model, best known for her role as C. J. Parker in the film Baywatch.

Early life
Was born in New York City and raised in Greenwich, Connecticut. She is the daughter of Anne (née Wholly) and Clay Rohrbach, a financier. She attended Greenwich Academy. She played golf for Greenwich and earned an athletic scholarship to Georgetown University to play golf for the Georgetown Hoyas. She graduated from Georgetown in 2012 with a degree in theatre, and enrolled at the London Academy of Music and Dramatic Art to pursue acting.

Career

Rohrbach had small roles in the TV series Two and a Half Men, The New Normal, Rizzoli & Isles, Broad City, and Rush.

After working in Hollywood for two years, Rohrbach began modeling. She appeared in Gap Inc.'s 2014 holiday marketing campaign and for Old Navy denim in 2015. She appeared in the 2015 Sports Illustrated Swimsuit Issue, and was named its "Rookie of the Year". She played C. J. Parker in the 2017 feature film Baywatch, which is based on the 1989–2001 TV series of the same name.

Personal life 
Rohrbach dated actor Leonardo DiCaprio in 2015. In 2019, she married attorney and Walton family heir Steuart Walton. In December 2021, it was announced that the couple were expecting their first child, a boy.

Filmography

Film

Television

References

External links

 
 
 Kelly Rohrbach at guhoyas.com
 Kelly Rohrbach at Models.com
 Kelly Rohrbach at SI Swimsuit

1990 births
21st-century American actresses
Living people
Actresses from Greenwich, Connecticut
Actresses from New York City
American people of German descent
American people of Swiss descent
American people of Italian descent
American female golfers
American female models
Georgetown Hoyas women's golfers
IMG Models models
Walton family